Thomas Carlyle Leslie Fairbairn (25 April 1889 – 20 April 1964) was an Australian rules footballer who played with Geelong in the Victorian Football League (VFL).

Notes

External links 

1889 births
1964 deaths
People educated at Geelong Grammar School
Australian rules footballers from Victoria (Australia)
Australian Rules footballers: place kick exponents
Geelong Football Club players
People from Sale, Victoria